The Osgoode Hall Law Journal is a law review affiliated with Osgoode Hall Law School of York University, Toronto, Canada. It has been publishing continuously since 1958.

References

External links

Canadian law journals
Publications established in 1958
English-language journals
1958 establishments in Ontario
Osgoode Hall Law School